Coke Boys 6 is a collaborative mixtape by Moroccan-American rapper French Montana and American disc jockey DJ Drama. It was released through Coke Boys Records on January 6, 2023. The mixtape contains guest appearances from Stove God Cooks, Cheeze, the late Chinx, Smooky Margielaa, ASAP Rocky, Vory, Max B, Rob49, Ayoub, Kenzo B, Jeremih, Benny the Butcher, DThang, EST Gee, Big30, Nav, King Combs, Kodak Black, and Pheelz. The "Money Heist Edition" of the mixtape was released simultaneously alongside the release of the original version. It contains additional guest appearances from Kenzo B, Mr.Chicken, LGP Qua, Tory Lanez, Chinese Kitty, YNP Maine, CJ, T Dot, Bando Gz, Viso, and Jhettaheat. Production was handled by a variety of record producers, including Harry Fraud, Cubeatz, SprngBrk, ISM, Boi-1da, Matthew Burnett, Young Martey, Sahara, Cool & Dre, YC, Pro Logic, Frost, Rippa on the Beat, Miichkel, and Oogie Mane. The project serves as a mixtape for Gangsta Grillz, a mixtape series hosted by DJ Drama. It was originally supposed to be released on December 9, 2022, but it was delayed due to the release of Chinx's third studio album, CR6, which serves as the rapper's third posthumous project and was released exactly one week before the original release date of Coke Boys 6.

Release and promotion
On November 8, 2022, the day before Montana's 38th birthday, he announced the release of the mixtape. On January 2, 2023, Montana announced that Coke Boys 6 would serve as a mixtape for Gangsta Grillz, a series of mixtapes by rappers that is hosted by DJ Drama.

Singles
The lead single of the mixtape, "Slidin", which was performed by Montana and his brother, Ayoub, was released on July 22, 2022. The second single, "Fenty", which was performed by Montana and Canadian rapper Nav, was released on October 21, 2022. The third single, "Yes I Do", which was performed by Montana, was released on November 11, 2022. The fourth single, "Finesse", which was performed by Nigerian record producer Pheelz and Montana himself, was released on November 28, 2022.

Track listing

Engineer Credits

Mix engineer Baruch "Mixx" Nembhard

Mastering engineer Eric Lagg

Charts

References

2023 mixtape albums
French Montana albums
DJ Drama albums